Solute carrier family 12 member 8 (SLC12A8), also known as cation-chloride cotransporter 9 (CCC9), is a protein that in humans is encoded by the SLC12A8 gene.

References

Further reading 

 
 
 
 
 

Solute carrier family